The third season of the American drama/adventure television series Alias premiered September 28, 2003 on ABC and concluded May 23, 2004 and was released on DVD in region 1 on September 7, 2004. Guest stars in season three include Vivica A. Fox, Isabella Rossellini, Ricky Gervais, Griffin Dunne, Djimon Hounsou, Peggy Lipton, and Quentin Tarantino.

A seven-minute animated short titled The Animated Alias: Tribunal was produced for the DVD release of the third season. The short takes place between the second and third seasons.

Cast
Main characters
 Jennifer Garner as Sydney Bristow (22 episodes)
 Ron Rifkin as Arvin Sloane (21 episodes)
 Michael Vartan as Michael Vaughn (22 episodes)
 Carl Lumbly as Marcus Dixon (22 episodes)
 Kevin Weisman as Marshall Flinkman (22 episodes)
 David Anders as Julian Sark (20 episodes)
 Melissa George as Lauren Reed (19 episodes)
 Greg Grunberg as Eric Weiss (22 episodes)
 Victor Garber as Jack Bristow (22 episodes)

Recurring characters

Episodes

Home release
The 6-DVD box set of Season 3 was released in region 1 format (US) on September 7, 2004, in region 2 format (UK) on May 30, 2005 and in region 4 format (AU) on January 5, 2005. The DVDs contain all episodes of Season 3, plus the following features:
 Animated Alias: Tribunal – a brief animated feature detailing a mission that Sydney undertook during her "missing" two years.
 Deleted scenes
 Blooper reel
 Featurette: Burbank to Barcelona – a look at the production design
 Gadget Lab – Marshall Finkman's gadgets from script to screen
 The Alias Diaries – meet the unsung craftsmen and technicians
 Team Alias – two sport-related features: a special introduction filmed for Monday Night Football, and Michael Vartan meets the Stanley Cup.
 Ultimate fan audio commentary
 Script scanner
 Cast & Crew Commentaries
 Widescreen anamorphic video format.

References

External links
 Alias Season 3 detailed synopses at Alias-TV.com
 

2003 American television seasons
2004 American television seasons
Alias (TV series) seasons